Ben D. Altamirano (October 17, 1930 – December 27, 2007) was an American politician and businessman who served as a member of the New Mexico Senate from 1971 until his death in 2007.

Early life and education
Altamirano was born in Silver City, New Mexico in 1930. He enlisted in the United States Army in 1946 and served with the European occupation forces after World War II. After his stint in the Army, he attended Western New Mexico University.

Career
Altamirano began his political career on the Silver City Town Council, where he served for 10 years. He then served for four years on the Grant County Commission.

In 1970, Altamirano was elected to the New Mexico Senate, representing District 28. He took office in 1971 and served until his death. At the time of his death, Senator Altamirano was the longest-serving senator in the State of New Mexico history.

Altamirano ran for lieutenant governor in 1994. He was one of four candidates in the Democratic primary and lost the primary to Patricia Madrid, who lost that November.

Altamirano served as chairman of the powerful Finance Committee for 17 years before being selected by his colleagues to serve as President Pro Tempore in 2003.

Personal life
Altamirano owned several grocery stores for 40 years and was married to Nina Melendrez. They had two sons and a daughter, and also helped raise their nieces and nephew.

Death 
Altamirano died from a heart attack on December 27, 2007. He was 77. He had suffered from heart ailments since 1981 and had recently undergone surgery. He was buried in Memory Lane Cemetery in Silver City, New Mexico. He was survived by his wife, his three children, and all of his family. On January 9, 2008, Governor Bill Richardson appointed Grant County Clerk Howie Morales to succeed Altamirano.

External links
Obituary from the Las Cruces Sun-News

1930 births
2007 deaths
Democratic Party New Mexico state senators
United States Army soldiers
People from Silver City, New Mexico
Western New Mexico University alumni
20th-century American politicians